Help Scout, legally Help Scout PBC, is a global remote company which is a provider of help desk software and is headquartered in Boston, Massachusetts. The company provides an email-based customer support platform, knowledge base tool, and an embeddable search/contact widget for customer service professionals. Help Scout's main product (also called Help Scout) is a web-based SaaS (software as a service) HIPAA-compliant help desk.

Founded in 2011, the company serves more than 10,000 customers in over 140 countries including Buffer, Basecamp, Trello, Reddit, and AngelList. Many employees are remote workers with over 100 employees living in more than 80 cities worldwide. In 2020, the company has sublet their office in Boston and turned the company into a distributed company (entirely remote).

History
Nick Francis, Jared McDaniel, and Denny Swindle ran Brightwurks, a web design consultancy in Nashville, Tennessee for six years before building Help Scout, a help desk software. 

The co-founders launched Help Scout publicly while participating in Techstars Boston, a startup accelerator program. Help Scout raised $800k in angel funding soon after Techstars and was profitable for nearly two years before raising $6 million in Series A funding in 2015, from Foundry Group and Converge Venture Partners. Brightwurks was renamed Help Scout in 2015.

Features and technology

Help Desk

Help Scout's support software operates like a shared email inbox. Help Scout enables large teams to provide customer support via email with their tool. The platform features integrations with live chat, phone systems, CRMs, and email marketing tools.

Docs

In addition to its help desk platform, Help Scout offers a feature called Docs, a self-service knowledge base for customers to find answers to support questions. Docs was launched as a feature in 2013.

Beacon

This embeddable widget provides users on a website with quick access to Docs and/or serves as a contact form.

Mobile

Help Scout launched its iOS app in January 2016 and its Android app in February 2017.

Open source contribution 

One of the developers at Help Scout created an open source CSS framework that is available to the general public. It is currently being used to style the marketing website.

 Seed's code base written using Sass, following the naming architecture of BEM and ITCSS.
 Its collection of modules (called "Seed Packs") and components draw inspiration from a handful of libraries and frameworks such as Bootstrap and Tachyons.
 Unlike traditional Sass/CSS methodologies, Seed's architecture is more similar to modern Javascript code bases and workflows.
 Techniques like scoping, modularization, and dependency management are heavily utilized and baked into the core of Seed.
 Additional information about the framework as well as Getting Started documentation can be found at seedcss.com.

Work culture
Help Scout is an entirely remote company. To communicate company-wide, they often use video to share important updates.

Help Scout does not operate a traditional commission-based sales team. They instead hold a non-commission structure with the sales team members receiving a fixed salary.

Branding
Formerly known as Brightwurks, Help Scout officially changed its name to match their central Help Desk product in 2015.

Help Scout's original logo was a literal Help Scout (rather like a Boy Scout) before changing to a medal, then a laurel wreath, and is now currently three diagonal lines which denote the initials HS (Help Scout).

Awards, recognition, and philanthropy
In December 2011, Help Scout (known then as Brightwurks) participated in a fundraising initiative to benefit Acumen, a charity that helps tackle poverty. They designed and sold a poster of Steve Jobs' famous quote “Here’s to the crazy ones” and were able to donate over $100,000 to Acumen.

In November 2015, Help Scout was named by AppStorm as one of six customer service software offerings to delight customers for Mac. In 2015, Help Scout was also named a “marketing tool to know” by Business2Community and a “game-changing software solution” for startups by Business.com.  Since raising their Series A, Help Scout has been featured on multiple ‘best of’ lists in both marketing and customer service publications. In 2016, they were featured in BostInno’s “16 Boston Startups To Watch in 2016”. Help Scout also publishes a blog on customer support and a newsletter that has over 70,000 subscribers.

In 2015, Help Scout won “Best Job Description” from The Workies Awards by Workable.

See also
Comparison of help desk issue tracking software
Comparison of issue-tracking systems
Zendesk

References

External links
Official website

Automation software
Customer service
Email
Help desk software
Software companies based in Massachusetts
Technology companies based in the Boston area
Remote companies
2011 establishments in Massachusetts
Software companies established in 2011